Kesar (saffron) is a Hindi-language TV series from 2004 to 2007. 

Kesar may also refer to:

 Kesar, Lakan, Rasht County, Gilan Province
 Kesar, Pasikhan, Rasht County, Gilan Province
 Kesar, Khuzestan